Bilo Jednom u Hrvatskoj: Split - Stari plac (Once upon a time in Croatia: Split - Stari plac) is a live concert album by the Croatian band Thompson, led by singer Marko Perkovic. It was released in December 2007, nearly a year after the in-studio album of the same name.

The album was recorded at the band's concert in Split in front of over 25,000 people.

Tracks

References

Thompson (band) albums
2007 live albums